William Bedell Stanford (16 January 1910 – 30 December 1984) was an Irish classical scholar and senator. He was Regius Professor of Greek at Trinity College Dublin between 1940 and 1980 and served as the 22nd chancellor of the university between 1982 and 1984.

He was born in Belfast, the son of a Dublin-born Church of Ireland clergyman who served in Waterford and Tipperary. He was educated at Bishop Foy's School in Waterford, where a special teacher had to be recruited to coach him in Greek. He subsequently won a sizarship to Trinity College Dublin. He was elected a Scholar in his first year at Trinity, having become an undergraduate in October 1928. He also served as auditor of the College Classical Society. He was editor of TCD: A College Miscellany in Hilary term of 1931. He became a Fellow in 1934 and was one of the last Fellows to be elected by examination. Stanford was one of seven candidates nominated for the Provostship of the Trinity College on 11 March 1952 but was eliminated along with two other candidates in the first round of the election. He was considered, at the age of 42, to be too junior. The successful candidate on that occasion was the mathematician, Albert Joseph McConnell, who remained in office for 22 years.

His grandfather's cousin was the composer Charles Villiers Stanford.

Academic career
Stanford established himself as a Greek scholar in his twenties with the publication of two books which approached Greek literature as a subject for literary criticism, Greek Metaphor and Ambiguity in Greek Literature. He is perhaps best remembered for his commentaries aimed at students on Homer's Odyssey, Aristophanes' Frogs, and Sophocles' Ajax.

In 1965, Stanford gave the Sather Lectures at the University of California, Berkeley, on the topic of the pronunciation of Ancient Greek. The lectures were revised into a book published in 1967.

Stanford had a particular interest in the classical tradition, in Ireland and elsewhere, and published a number of articles on this topic in the Trinity journal Hermathena, as well as a brief but wide-ranging book entitled Ireland and the Classical Tradition.

A long-time member of the Royal Irish Academy, Stanford was appointed chairman of the Dublin Institute for Advanced Studies by the President of Ireland, Éamon de Valera.

Stanford's poetry appears in several anthologies and his posthumously published memoirs.

After Stanford's death, a series of lectures in his honour was established at Trinity College, Dublin. The first lecturer in the series was Duncan F. Kennedy, a former student of Stanford's.

Seanad career
He also represented the Dublin University constituency in Seanad Éireann between 1948 and 1969. During the 1950s, however, he had the courage to come out publicly against the Fethard-on-Sea Boycott, and he also demanded an inquiry into the assault on Jehovah's Witnesses in Clare. In both cases, Éamon de Valera proved sympathetic personally but declined to take any public action. As a leader of the Republic of Ireland's small Protestant population, Stanford was a lifelong champion of the proportional representation electoral process, believing that it protected the rights of minorities.

Bibliography
Greek Metaphor: Studies in Theory and Practice, Oxford 1936
Ambiguity in Greek Literature, Oxford 1939
Aeschylus in His Style: A Study in Language and Personality, Dublin 1942
The Odyssey of Homer, Vol.1 (Books 1–12), London 1947
The Odyssey of Homer, Vol.2 (Books 13–24), London 1948
The Ulysses Theme: A Study in the Adaptability of a Traditional Hero, Oxford 1955; second ed. Putnam, Conn. 1993
The Frogs, by Aristophanes, London 1958
Ajax, by Sophocles, London 1963
The Sound of Greek: Studies in the Greek Theory and Practice of Euphony, Berkeley 1967
Mahaffy: A Biography of an Anglo-Irishman (with R. B. McDowell), London 1971
The Quest for Ulysses (with John Victor Luce), London 1974
Ireland and the Classical Tradition, Dublin 1976
Enemies of Poetry, London 1980
Greek tragedy and the emotions : an introductory study, London 1983
The Travels of Lord Charlemont in Greece & Turkey, 1749 (with Eustathios J Finopoulos), London 1984
Stanford: Regius Professor of Greek, 1940–80, Trinity College, Dublin: Memoirs, Dublin 2002

References

External links
The Stanford Memorial Lectures

1910 births
1984 deaths
Academics of Trinity College Dublin
Chancellors of the University of Dublin
Classical scholars of Trinity College Dublin
Independent members of Seanad Éireann
Irish Anglicans
Irish classical scholars
Members of Seanad Éireann for Dublin University
Members of the 6th Seanad
Members of the 7th Seanad
Members of the 8th Seanad
Members of the 9th Seanad
Members of the 10th Seanad
Members of the 11th Seanad
Members of the Royal Irish Academy
Writers from Belfast
Scholars of ancient Greek literature
Scholars of Trinity College Dublin